Regurgitation or regurgitate may refer to:
 Regurgitation (circulation)
 Regurgitation (digestion)
 Regurgitate (band), a Swedish goregrind band

See also
 Disgorge (disambiguation)